Dragoș Dima (born 16 June 1992 in Ploiești) is a Romanian professional tennis player. He has a career high ATP singles ranking of 279 achieved on 24 September 2018. He also has a career high ATP doubles ranking of 903 achieved on 27 June 2016.

Dima represents Romania at the Davis Cup making his debut on 15 September 2017 against Austria's Gerald Melzer in 1st round play-offs of Group I.

ATP Challenger Tour and ITF Futures finals

Singles: 22 (9 titles, 13 runners-up)

Doubles: 2 (0 titles, 2 runners-up)

Davis Cup

Singles performances (1–2)

References

External links

1992 births
Living people
Romanian male tennis players
Tennis players from Bucharest
Sportspeople from Ploiești
21st-century Romanian people